The 1987–88 WHL season was the 22nd season for the Western Hockey League.  Fourteen teams completed a 72-game season.  The Medicine Hat Tigers won their second consecutive President's Cup and Memorial Cup.

League notes
The Calgary Wranglers relocated to Lethbridge, Alberta to become the Lethbridge Hurricanes.

Regular season

Final standings

Scoring leaders
Note: GP = Games played; G = Goals; A = Assists; Pts = Points; PIM = Penalties in minutes

1988 WHL Playoffs

First round
Saskatoon earned a bye
Medicine Hat earned a bye
Prince Albert defeated Brandon 3 games to 1
Swift Current defeated Regina 3 games to 1

Division semi-finals
Saskatoon defeated Swift Current 4 games to 2
Medicine Hat defeated Prince Albert 4 games to 2
Kamloops defeated New Westminster 5 games to 0
Spokane defeated Victoria 5 games to 3

Division finals
Medicine Hat defeated Saskatoon 4 games to 0
Kamloops defeated Spokane 5 games to 2

WHL Championship
Medicine Hat defeated Kamloops 4 games to 2

All-Star game

On January 12, the East Division defeated the West Division 5–4 at Kamloops, British Columbia before a crowd of 2,689.

WHL awards

All-Star Teams

See also
1988 Memorial Cup
1988 NHL Entry Draft
1987 in sports
1988 in sports

References
whl.ca
 2005–06 WHL Guide

Western Hockey League seasons
WHL
WHL